Joseph Franklin Hiestand (November 26, 1906 – October 5, 2004) was a member of the Ohio House of Representatives, who died in 2004.

References

External links
 Trapshooter Hall of Fame Joe Hiestand

2004 deaths
Republican Party members of the Ohio House of Representatives
1906 births
20th-century American politicians